Luciana Angiolillo (22 December 1925 – 30 November 2014) was an Italian actress and model, known for her career in peplum classic films.

Life and career 
Born Luciana Nevi in Rome, Angiolillo started her career as a runway model. She made her film debut thanks to the friendship of Ennio Flaiano, who suggested her to the director Luciano Emmer for the role of an upper class lady in Camilla.  From then she appeared in a number of films, often in stereotypal roles of snobbish bourgeois ladies. Gradually relegated to secondary roles, Angiolillo eventually devoted herself to the direction of a fashion house owned by her.

Angiolillo died on November 30, 2014.

Selected filmography
 Camilla (1954)
 A Woman Alone (1956)
 First Love (1959)
 Wild Cats on the Beach (1959)
 Colossus and the Amazon Queen (1960)
 Girl with a Suitcase (1961)
 Hercules and the Conquest of Atlantis (1961)
 The Trojan Horse (1961)
 The Easy Life (1962)
 Alone Against Rome (1962)
 Love and Marriage (1964)
 Berlin, Appointment for the Spies (1965)
 Countdown to Doomsday (1966)
 Grand Slam (1967)
 The Wild Eye (1967)

References

External links 
 

1925 births
2014 deaths
Italian film actresses
Italian television actresses
Italian stage actresses
20th-century Italian actresses
Actresses from Rome